U.S. Route 85B (US 85B) is an approximately  temporary auxiliary route of US 85 located entirely within Williams County in the state of North Dakota. The highway serves as an eastern bypass around the city of Williston. The establishment of the route was a temporary solution to the rapid increase in truck traffic in the area due to the North Dakota oil boom. The county plans on eventually replacing the highway with an expressway bypass, dubbed the "Northeastern Truck Reliever Route", once funding is gathered. US 85 already bypasses the city as an expressway to the west.

Route description
After turning south, the route continues in this direction for exactly , before reaching an intersection with 54th Street Northwest that marks the eastern terminus of CR 7B. After this, the route continues south for just under  before terminating at a T intersection with North Dakota Highway 1804 (ND 1804) within Williston city limits. The highway runs roughly parallel to the Little Muddy River for most of its length.

Major intersections

See also

References

	

85B (Williams County)
B (Williams County, North Dakota)
Transportation in Williams County, North Dakota
85B (Williams County, North Dakota)
Williston, North Dakota